Riverbank Army Ammunition Plant is located just outside Riverbank, California, in Stanislaus County. The facility was built in 1942 as an aluminum reduction plant operated by Alcoa producing 48,000 tons per year for World War II aircraft manufacture until 1944. It was reactivated in 1951 for the Korean War and was the United States' largest producer of steel cartridge cases until 1958. It reopened in 1966 manufacturing mortar shells and projectiles for the Vietnam War and remained in production until 1981.

In 2005, the 2005 Base Realignment and Closure Commission recommended that the base be closed and its functions transferred to Rock Island Arsenal. The Riverbank Local Redevelopment Authority assumed responsibility for the site in 2010.

In 2022, Aemetis acquired a 24-acre Site in Riverbank, California, for carbon capture and sequestration injection wells. Part of the 125-acre Riverbank Industrial Complex, the site is planned for the annual permanent sequestration of 1 million metric tonnes of carbon dioxide from industrial and agricultural sources. Aemetis has a mission to transform renewable energy with below zero carbon intensity transportation fuels. Aemetis has launched the Carbon Zero production process to decarbonize the transportation sector using today’s infrastructure.

References

External links

Installations of the United States Army in California
Ammunition manufacturers
Historic American Engineering Record in California
Military Superfund sites
Buildings and structures in Stanislaus County, California
United States Army arsenals
United States Army arsenals during World War II
Superfund sites in California